Akauveh Erumena Glenn (born July 22, 1985), stage name Glenn Mena, is a Nigerian singer, songwriter, and instrumentalist.

Personal life
Glenn Mena is the second son of five siblings, born to Meshach Akauveh Akarah and Regina I. Akarah. He is a Business Administration graduate from Lead City University, Ibadan.

Career
Mena began making music with a friend in secondary school.

He was nominated for a City People Entertainment Award. At the 2013 MAYA Awards he was the winner of the "Best New Act" category, and the same song won him another nomination in the "Next Rated Act" category at the 2015 Scream All Youths Awards.

In 2015, he released a single titled "Packaging". In January 2017, he was featured on TV presenter Shine Begho's Mischief Show, where he hinted at the release of his first EP, Mask&Music. In August 2017, he released the low-tempo song "Take Over". In 2018, he released the single "Swerve".

On 20 June 2019, Mena had his first international feature as he premièred his new single "Yoruba Demon" on Complex Magazine. The single, which features Problem Solved, is off the singer's upcoming album.

Discography

Awards and nominations

References 

Nigerian songwriters
Nigerian musicians
1985 births
Living people
Musicians from Delta State
Lead City University alumni

External links